Becky Shah is a British woman human rights defender who was the daughter of one of the victims of the Hillsborough disaster. Shah was a longtime campaigner for the reopening of the Hillsborough inquiry into the causes of the disaster, and has campaigned to defend the Human Rights Act.

Following the Hillsborough disaster, West Midlands police took statements from Shah and her brother which attempted to suggest that their mother had been drinking. She wrote for Amnesty International following the inquiry verdict in 2016 that "The determination of our campaign and the power of the Human Rights Act were crucial in securing the verdict on 26 April 2016". Shah has supported Amnesty International's campaign to prevent the repeal of the Human Rights Act following Britain's withdrawal from the European Union.

Along with relatives of the other 96 victims of the Hillsborough disaster, Shah has severely criticised the Crown Prosecution Service' decision not to open criminal proceedings into the conduct of West Midlands Police.

Shah has also supported families campaigning for inquests into the deaths of their relatives in police custody.

References 

Women human rights activists
Living people
Year of birth missing (living people)